Methylorubrum extorquens is a Gram-negative bacterium. Methylorubrum species often appear pink, and are classified as pink-pigmented facultative methylotrophs, or PPFMs. The wild type has been known to use both methane and multiple carbon compounds as energy sources. Specifically, M. extorquens has been observed to use primarily methanol and C1 compounds as substrates in their energy cycles. It has been also observed that use lanthanides as a cofactor to increase its methanol dehydrogenase activity

Genetic structure 
After isolation from soil, M. extorquens was found to have a single chromosome measuring 5.71-Mb. The bacterium itself contains 70 genes over eight regions of the chromosome that are used for its metabolism of methanol. Within a section of the chromosome, of M. extorquens AM1 are two xoxF genes that enable it to grow in methanol.

M. extorquens AM1 genome encodes a 47.5 kb gene of unknown function. This gene encodes an over 15,000 residue-long polypeptide along with three unique compounds that are not expressed. The microbe uses the mxa gene as a way to dehydrogenate methanol and use it as an energy source.

Chemical use 
Methylorubrum extorquens uses primarily C1 and C2 compounds to grow. Utilizing compounds with few carbon-carbon bonds allows the bacterium to successfully grow in environments with methanol, such as on the surface of leaves whose stomata emit methanol. The ability to use methanol as both a carbon and energy source was show to be advantageous when colonizing Medicago truncatula.

H4MPT-dependent formaldehyde oxidation was first isolated in M. extroquens AM1 and has been used to define if an organism is utilizing methylotrophic metabolism.

Relationships with other organisms 
Many bacteria within the family Methylobacteriaceae live in different biotic environments such as soils, dust, and plant leaves. Some of these bacteria have been found in symbiotic relationships with the plants they inhabit in which they provide fixed nitrogen or produce vitamin B12. M. extorquens also produces PhyR which plants use to regulate stress response, allowing the plant to survive in different conditions. In addition to PhyR, the bacterium can produce a hormone related to overall plant and root growth.

M. extorquens has been found to have a mutualistic relationship with strawberries. Ultimately, M. extorquens is used to oxidize 1,2-propanediol to lactaldehyde, which is later used in chemical reactions. If introduced to blooming plants, furaneol production increases, changing the way the strawberry tastes.

See also 
 Methylacidiphilum fumariolicum
 Methylobacterium radiotolerans

References

External links 
Methylorubrum J.P. Euzéby: List of Prokaryotic names with Standing in Nomenclature
Methylobacterium extorquens NCBI
Type strain of Methylobacterium extorquens at BacDive -  the Bacterial Diversity Metadatabase

Hyphomicrobiales
Bacteria described in 1985
Formatotrophs